Ekaterina Aleksandrovna Zyuzina (born 8 December 1996) is a Russian sailor. She competed in the Laser Radial event at the 2020 Summer Olympics.

References

External links
 
 

1996 births
Living people
Russian female sailors (sport)
Olympic sailors of Russia
Sailors at the 2020 Summer Olympics – Laser Radial
Sportspeople from Lipetsk